The PowerPC 5000 family is a series of PowerPC and Power ISA microprocessors from Freescale (previously Motorola) and STMicroelectronics designed for automotive and industrial microcontroller and system on a chip (SoC) use. The MPC5000 family consists of two lines (51xx/52xx and 55xx/56xx) that really don't share a common heritage.

Processors

MPC51xx
 The MGT5100 was introduced in 2002 and Motorola's first CPU for its mobileGT SoC-platform for telematic, information and entertainment applications in cars. Based on the e300 core that stems from the PowerPC 603e, it ran in speeds up to 230 MHz and includes a double precision FPU, 16/16 kB L1 data/instruction caches and a rich set of I/O peripherals like DDR SDRAM, USB, PCI, Ethernet, IrDA and ATA disk controllers.
 The MPC5121e was introduced in May 2007 and is based on the MPC5200B. It is a 400 MHz highly integrated SoC processor targeted for telematics applications and includes controllers for USB, PCI, networking, DDR RAM and disk storage. It also has an on-die PowerVR MBX Lite GPU supporting 3D acceleration and displays up to 1280×720 pixels and a fully programmable 200 MHz RISC co-processor designed for multimedia processing like real-time audio and speech recognition.
 The MPC5123 was introduced in April 2008  and is essentially a MPC5121e without the PowerVR coprocessor. It's designed for telematics, point of sales systems, health care equipment, display kiosks and industrial automation.

MPC52xx

The MPC5200 family is based on the e300 core MGT5100 processor and is also a part of Freescale's mobileGT platform.
 MPC5200 – 266–400 MHz, on-chip controllers for DDR-RAM, PCI, Ethernet, USB, ATA, serial, DMA and other I/O. Introduced in 2003, replaced by the MPC5200B.
 MPC5200B – 266-466 MHz, enhanced MPC5200, introduced in 2005. Also used in the small EFIKA computer.

MPC55xx
Based on the e200 core that stems from the MPC5xx core, it is upwards-compatible with the newer e500 core and the older PowerPC Book E specification. Focus is on automotive and industrial control systems, like robotics, power train and fuel injection. The cores are the basis for a multitude of SoC controllers ranging from 40 to 600 MHz  with a variety of additional functionality, like Flash-ROM, Ethernet controllers, and custom I/O. All MPC55xx processors are compliant with the Power ISA v.2.03 specification.

The MPC55xx family have four slightly different cores from the really low end and to the high end.
 MPC5510 – uses an e200z1 core, with an optional e200z0 core as co-processor.
 MPC5533 and MPC5534 – uses e200z3 cores.
 MPC5553, MPC5554, MPC5561, MPC5565, MPC5566 and MPC5567 – uses e200z6 cores.

MPC56xx
The MPC56xx family are PowerPC e200 core based microcontrollers jointly developed by Freescale and STMicroelectronics. Built on a 90 nm fabrication process. These microcontrollers are tailor-made for automotive applications like power steering, fuel injection, display control, powertrain, active suspension, chassis control, anti-lock braking systems, and radar for adaptive cruise control. Freescale calls these processors MPC56xx and ST names them SPC56x.

MPC560xB/C or SPC560B/C – Uses a single e200z0 core at up to 64 MHz, up to 512 kB Flash memory, 64 kB EEPROM, up to 48 kB RAM. Used for automotive body electronics applications.
MPC560xP or SPC560P – Uses a single e200z0 core at up to 60 MHz, up to 512 kB Flash memory, up to 64 kB EEPROM, up to 40 kB RAM. Used for chassis and airbag control.
MPC560xS or SPC560S –  Uses a single e200z0 core at up to 64 MHz, up to 1 MB Flash memory, 64 kB EEPROM, up to 48 kB RAM, and an on-chip display controller with up to 160 kB VRAM. Used for TFT color display control.
MPC563xM or SPC563M – Uses a single e200z3 core at up to 80 MHz, up to 1.5 MB Flash memory, up to 111 kB SRAM. Used for entry-level powertrain applications.
MPC564xL or SPC56EL – Uses dual e200z4 cores at 120 MHz, 1 MB Flash memory, 128 kB SRAM.
MPC5668G – Uses one e200z6 core and one e200z0 core at up to 128 MHz, up to 2 MB Flash memory, 592 kB SRAM, integrated Ethernet controller.
MPC5674F – Uses an e200z7 core, up to 264 MHz, up to 4 MB Flash, 256 kB RAM. Used for powertrain, fuel and motor control.

See also 
 PowerPC e200
 PowerPC e300
 PowerPC e500
 mobileGT

References 

 Freescale's Power Architecture portfolio
 Freescale's Power Architecture technology primer
 Freescale’s e200 Core Family, Overview and Licensing Model, White paper
 Freescale's MPC52xx page
 Freescale's MPC5121e page
 Freescale's MPC55xx page
 Freescale's MPC56xx page

External links

5000
Motorola microprocessors
Freescale microprocessors
Microcontrollers